Uninvited, Like the Clouds is the 20th album by the Australian alternative rock band The Church. It was released in Australia on 20 March 2006 and internationally on 17 April.

James Christopher Monger at AllMusic gave it four stars, calling it "a bloated, beautiful, unsettling storm of a record" with "everything an adoring fan could want, and all the ammunition a detractor could carry." Bernard Zuel of The Sydney Morning Herald found it "is a summation of 26 years, drawing from all of the elements with sure rather than desperate hands" where saying that it is "the kind of collection that will warm the hearts of those for whom the 1980s and early 1990s remain the golden years of the Church, should not be read as an indication that the band has retro-fitted its career".

Track listing

Some versions of the album do not contain track 12, "Song to Go...".

Personnel 

 Steve Kilbey – lead vocals, bass guitar, keyboards, guitar
 Peter Koppes – guitars, keyboards, bass guitar, backing vocals, lead vocal on "Never Before"
 Tim Powles – drums, percussion, backing vocals
 Marty Willson-Piper – guitars, bass guitar, backing vocals, lead vocal on "She'll Come Back For You Tomorrow"

Additional musicians
 Jorden Brebach – guitar ("Space Needle"), backing vocals
 Sophie Glasson – cello ("Song to Go ...")
 David Lane – piano ("Overview")

Production details
 Producer – The Church
 Additional production – Tim Powles, Jorden Brebach
 Engineer – Jorden Brebach, David Trump, Ted Howard
 Additional engineering – Tim Powles, Jorden Brebach
 Assistant track engineer – Giles Muldoon
 Mixer – David Trump
 Mastering – Don Bartley
 Studios – Spacejunk 1, Rancom Street and Dodgy Sound (recording); The Vault (mixing); Studios 301 (mastering)

Artworks
 Painting – Steve Kilbey
 Design, layout – Karl Logge

References

The Church (band) albums
2006 albums